General Henry may refer to:

Sir George Henry Waller, 3rd Baronet (1837–1892), British Army major general
Guy Henry (equestrian) (1875–1967), U.S. Army major general
Guy Vernor Henry (1839–1899), Union Army major general
James D. Henry (1797–1834), Illinois Militia brigadier general in the Black Hawk War
John B. Henry Jr. (1916–2013), U.S. Air Force major general
Richard C. Henry (1925–2020), U.S. Air Force lieutenant general
William W. Henry (1831–1915), Union Army brevet brigadier general
Prince William Henry, Duke of Gloucester and Edinburgh (1743–1805), British Army general

See also
Attorney General Henry (disambiguation)